Tardu is a common masculine Turkish given name. In Turkish, "Tardu" means "a Light Coming from Darkness".

Real People
 Tardu, the second yabgu and the first khagan of the Western Turkic Khaganate.
 Tardush Shad, first yabgu of Tokharistan.
 Tardu Flordun, a Turkish actor appearing in Binbir Gece (see also Turkish Wikipedia article).

Turkish masculine given names